The 16th Division was one of the divisions of the Spanish Republican Army that were organized during the Spanish Civil War on the basis of the Mixed Brigades. It had an outstanding participation in the Battle of the Ebro.

History 
The division was created on March 13, 1937, formed by the 23rd, 66th and 77th mixed brigades; its first commander was Ernesto Güemes Ramos. Initially assigned to the IV Army Corps, in May 1937 it became part of the III Army Corps, on the Madrid front. For several months the division was stationed there, limiting itself to garrison work and not intervening in relevant military operations.

In the spring of 1938, when the Aragon Offensive took place, the division was sent to try to reinforce the republican defenses. Meanwhile its 24th Mixed Brigade took part in the Battle of Lleida, in support of the 46th Division. Months later, the 23rd Mixed Brigade participated in the Balaguer Offensive.

Battle of the Ebro
Subsequently, the division was assigned to the XII Army Corps, in the Battle of the Ebro. The anarchist Manuel Mora Torres assumed command of the unit. On July 28, the 16th Division crossed the river, heading towards Gandesa in support of the republican units that were already deployed there. The division was later located in the central sector of the Republican zone, under the command of Pedro Mateo Merino. Along with the 35th Division and members of the 46th Division - reinforced with armored forces - it participated in the Republican assaults against Gandesa, which resulted in failure. At the beginning of August it was assigned to the XV Army Corps of Manuel Tagüeña. On August 22, a nationalist attack against the 16th Division's positions caused their disbandment, including the commander of the unit, who was promptly fired. A day before, the largest of the Mora militias signed an order that read: "Whoever leaves their post, they will suffer and the just punishment to which they are creditors will be applied, in whose application this Command will be inflexible."

Front of the Segre
Later the division returned to the rear. In November, it participated in the failed Serós offensive together with troops from the 34th Division. At the beginning of the Catalonia Offensive the division had a poor performance, giving up its positions in the Battle of the Segre.  According to Jorge Martínez Reverte, at that time the unit was very demoralized. During the rest of the battle for Catalonia, the 16th Division played an irrelevant role.

Command 
Commanders
 Ernesto Güemes Ramos;
 Domingo Benages Sacristán;
 Manuel Fresno Urzáiz;
 Manuel Mora Torres;
 Sebastián Zamora Medina;

Commissars
 Ernesto Antuña García, of the PSOE;

Chiefs of Staff
Manuel Pérez Cabello;

Order of battle

Notes

References

Bibliography
 
 
 
 
 
 
 
 
 
 
 

Military units and formations established in 1937
Military units and formations disestablished in 1939
Divisions of Spain
Military units and formations of the Spanish Civil War
Military history of Spain
Armed Forces of the Second Spanish Republic
1937 establishments in Spain
1939 disestablishments in Spain